This is a list in alphabetical order of cricketers who have played for Gloucestershire County Cricket Club in top-class matches since the club was founded in 1870. Gloucestershire has always had first-class status. It has been a List A team since the beginning of limited overs cricket in 1963; and a top-class Twenty20 team since the inauguration of the Twenty20 Cup in 2003.

The details are the player's usual name followed by the years in which he was active as a Gloucestershire player and then his name is given as it usually appears on match scorecards. Note that many players represented other top-class teams besides Gloucestershire and some, including the Grace brothers, played for teams styled Gloucestershire before 1870. Current players are shown as active to the latest season in which they played for the club. The list excludes Second XI and other players who did not play for the club's first team; and players whose first team appearances were in minor matches only.

A
 Dennis A'Court (1960–1963) : D. G. A'Court
 Stephen Adshead (2004–2009) : S. J. Adshead
 Terry Alderman (1988) : T. M. Alderman
 Ernest Alderwick (1908) : E. E. G. Alderwick
 Basil Allen (1932–1951) : B. O. Allen
 Charles Allen (1909) : C. Allen
 David Allen (1953–1972) : D. A. Allen
 Mark Alleyne (1986–2005) : M. W. Alleyne
 Ben Allison (2019) : B. M. J. Allison
 Hampden Alpass (1926–1928) : H. J. H. Alpass
 Jim Andrew (1959–1966) : F. J. Andrew
 Jo Angel (2002) : J. Angel
 Martin Ashenden (1962–1965) : M. Ashenden
 Alfred Atfield (1893) : A. J. Atfield
 Bill Athey (1984–1992) : C. W. J. Athey
 James Averis (1994–2006) : J. M. M. Averis

B
 Andrew Babington (1991–1994) : A. M. Babington
 Derrick Bailey (1949–1952) : D. T. L. Bailey
 William Baillie (1870) : W. H. Baillie
 Phil Bainbridge (1977–1990) : P. Bainbridge
 Francis Baker (1870–1875) : F. Baker
 Edward Ball (1880–1882) : E. W. Ball
 Martyn Ball (1988–2006) : M. C. J. Ball
 Ethan Bamber (2019) : E. R. Bamber
 Cameron Bancroft (2016–2017) : C. T. Bancroft
 Malinga Bandara (2005) : H. M. C. M. Bandara
 Vikram Banerjee (2006–2011) : V. Banerjee
 Stuart Barnes (1989–1991) : S. N. Barnes
 Charles Barnett (1904–1926) : C. S. Barnett
 Charlie Barnett (1927–1948) : C. J. Barnett
 Edgar Barnett (1903–1921) : E. P. Barnett
 Kim Barnett (1999–2002) : K. J. Barnett
 Percival Barnett (1908–1909) : P. P. Barnett
 Arthur Barrow (1919) : A. W. Barrow
 Claude Bateman-Champain (1898–1907) : C. E. Bateman-Champain
 Francis Bateman-Champain (1895–1914) : F. H. Bateman-Champain
 Hugh Bateman-Champain (1888–1902) : H. F. Bateman-Champain
 John Bateman-Champain (1899) : J. N. Bateman-Champain
 Jonathan Batty (2010–2012) : J. N. Batty
 Adrian Becher (1925–1929) : A. W. B. Becher
 Charles Belcher (1890–1892) : C. F. Belcher
 Malcolm Bell (1990–1991) : R. M. H. Bell
 Percy Bell (1911–1912) : P. H. Bell
 Gerald Beloe (1898–1899) : G. H. Beloe
 Frederick Bendall (1887) : F. G. Bendall
 Clement Bengough (1880) : C. S. Bengough
 Edward Benson (1929–1931) : E. T. Benson
 Richard Bernard (1956–1961) : J. R. Bernard
 John Bessant (1921–1928) : J. G. W. T. Bessant
 David Bevan (1964–1970) : D. G. Bevan
 Alfred Bewick (1903) : A. W. G. Bewick
 Frederick Bird (1899–1900) : F. N. Bird
 Michael Bissex (1961–1972) : M. Bissex
 Ernest Blackmore (1925) : E. G. Blackmore
 Herbert Blagrave (1922) : H. H. G. Blagrave
 Bernard Bloodworth (1919–1932) : B. S. Bloodworth
 James Bloor (1887) : J. H. Bloor
 Jack Board (1891–1914) : J. H. Board
 David Boden (1995–1996) : D. J. P. Boden
 Ravi Bopara (2012) : R. S. Bopara
 Allan Border (1977) : A. R. Border
 William Boroughs (1899–1901) : W. F. Boroughs
 Hubert Boughton (1884–1888) : H. J. Boughton
 William Boughton (1879–1883) : W. A. Boughton
 Jack Bowles (1911–1942) : J. J. Bowles
 James Bracey (2016–2020) : J. R. Bracey
 Frederick Bracher (1895–1897) : F. C. Bracher
 Nathan Bracken (2004) : N. W. Bracken
 Brian Brain (1976–1981) : B. M. Brain
 Joseph Brain (1883–1889) : J. H. Brain
 William Brain (1893) : W. H. Brain
 Andrew Brassington (1974–1988) : A. J. Brassington
 Alastair Bressington (2000–2004) : A. N. Bressington
 Edward Brice (1872–1873) : E. A. Brice
 Chris Broad (1979–1994) : B. C. Broad
 Arthur Brodhurst (1939–1946) : A. H. Brodhurst
 Richard Brooke (1931) : R. H. J. Brooke
 J. Brooks (1892) : J. Brooks
 Ian Broome (1980) : I. Broome
 Rowland Brotherhood (1875) : R. Brotherhood
 David Owen Brown (2006–2009) : D. O. Brown
 David W. J. Brown (1964–1967) : D. W. J. Brown
 Herbert Brown (1890–1894) : H. W. H. Brown
 Stanley Brown (1896–1919) : W. S. A. Brown
 Tony Brown (1953–1977) : A. S. Brown
 Walter Brown (1895) : W. M. R. Brown
 Elliott Browne (1872) : E. K. Browne
 Gerald Browne (1874) : G. E. K. Browne
 Leigh Brownlee (1901–1909) : L. D. Brownlee
 Wilfred Brownlee (1909–1914) : W. M. Brownlee
 Charles Bruton (1922) : C. L. Bruton
 John Bryan (1873) : J. Bryan
 John Burrough (1924–1937) : J. W. Burrough
 Dean Burrows (1984–1987) : D. A. Burrows
 David Burton (2006) : D. A. Burton
 James Bush (1870–1890) : J. A. Bush
 Robert Edwin Bush (1874–1877) : R. E. Bush
 Ian Butcher (1988–1990) : I. P. Butcher
 Ian Butler (2003–2010) : I. G. Butler

C
 David Carpenter (1954–1963) : D. Carpenter
 Frederic Carter (1871–1873) : F. A. Carter
 Walter Cave (1883) : W. F. Cave
 Mike Cawdron (1995–2001) : M. J. Cawdron
 Upul Chandana (2005) : U. D. U. Chandana
 Herbert Chard (1889) : H. W. Chard
 Ben Charlesworth (2018–2020) : B. G. Charlesworth
 Hugo Charteris (1910) : H. F. W. Charteris
 Algernon Chester-Master (1870) : A. W. Chester-Master
 Edgar Chester-Master (1911) : E. Chester-Master
 John Childs (1975–1984) : J. H. Childs
 Daniel Christian (2013) : D. T. Christian
 Matthew Church (1997–1998) : M. J. Church
 Basil Clarke (1914–1920) : B. F. Clarke
 Howard Cleaton (1971) : H. Cleaton
 Henry Clowes (1884) : H. Clowes
 Arthur Coates (1873–1878) : A. E. Coates
 Halsted Cobden (1872–1873) : H. S. Cobden
 Ian Cockbain (2011–2020) : I. A. Cockbain
 Frederick Cole (1879–1890) : F. L. Cole
 Gilbert Collett (1900–1914) : G. F. Collett
 Algernon Collings (1874) : A. W. Collings
 Sam Cook (1946–1964) : C. Cook
 Kevin Cooper (1992–1996) : K. E. Cooper
 Nicholas Cooper (1975–1978) : N. H. C. Cooper
 Leonard Corbett (1920–1925) : L. J. Corbett
 Norman Cornelius (1910–1911) : N. S. Cornelius
 Alan Cornwall (1920) : A. E. C. Cornwall
 Tom Cotterell (1999–2001) : T. P. Cotterell
 Richard Coughtrie (2011–2013) : R. G. Coughtrie
 Ed Cowan (2012) : E. J. M. Cowan
 Wilfred Craddy (1928) : W. H. Craddy
 Mark Craig (2014) : M. D. Craig
 Lionel Cranfield (1903–1922) : L. L. Cranfield
 Monty Cranfield (1934–1951) : L. M. Cranfield
 Eric Crankshaw (1909) : E. N. S. Crankshaw
 James Cranston (1876–1899) : J. Cranston
 Jack Crapp (1936–1956) : J. F. Crapp
 Ian Crawford (1975–1978) : I. C. Crawford
 Frederick Crooke (1874–1875) : F. J. Crooke
 Arthur Croome (1885–1892) : A. C. M. Croome
 Joseph Cross (1870) : J. J. Cross
 George Crossman (1896) : G. L. Crossman
 Martin Cullimore (1929) : M. H. Cullimore
 Robert Cunliffe (1993–2001) : R. J. Cunliffe
 Edward Cunningham (1982–1985) : E. J. Cunningham
 Kevin Curran (1985–1990) : K. M. Curran
 Oliver Currill (2017) : O. C. Currill
 Francis Curteis (1884) : F. A. Curteis

D
 Ces Dacre (1928–1936) : C. C. R. Dacre
 Chris Dale (1984) : C. S. Dale
 John Daniels (1964) : J. G. U. Daniels
 Jack Davey (1966–1978) : J. Davey
 Mark Davies (1992–1995) : M. Davies
 Richard Davis (1996–1997) : R. P. Davis
 Brian Davison (1985) : B. F. Davison
 Richard Dawson (1991–1999) : R. I. Dawson
 Robert Dawson (2008–2011) : R. K. J. Dawson
 Leonard Day (1880–1882) : L. M. Day
 Jason de la Peña (1991–1993) : J. M. de la Pêna
 George de Winton (1890–1901) : G. S. de Winton
 T. Dean (1908) : T. Dean
 Alfred Dearlove (1895–1900) : A. J. Dearlove
 George Dennett (1902–1926) : E. G. Dennett
 Chris Dent (2009–2020) : C. D. J. Dent
 Ernest Dewfall (1938) : E. G. Dewfall
 Tony Diment (1952) : R. A. Diment
 Andy Dindar (1962–1963) : A. Dindar
 Alfred Dipper (1908–1932) : A. E. Dipper
 Charles Disney (1923) : C. R. Disney
 John Dixon (1973–1981) : J. H. Dixon
 Richard Doughty (1981–1984) : R. J. Doughty
 Brendan Drew (2008) : B. G. Drew
 George Drissell (2017–2019) : G. S. Drissell
 Arthur du Boulay (1908) : A. H. du Boulay
 Barry Dudleston (1981–1983) : B. Dudleston
 Malcolm Dunstan (1971–1974) : M. S. T. Dunstan

E
 Desmond Eagar (1935–1943) : E. D. R. Eagar
 Michael Eagar (1957–1961) : M. A. Eagar
 Edwin Eden (1921) : E. Eden
 Ben Edmondson (2007) : B. M. Edmondson
 Charles Edwards (1911–1912) : C. W. Edwards
 Francis Ellis (1914–1921) : F. E. Ellis
 Richard Ellis (1985) : R. G. P. Ellis
 George Emmett (1936–1959) : G. M. Emmett
 Ernest English (1909) : E. R. M. English
 Bobby Etheridge (1955–1966) : R. J. Etheridge
 David Evans (1889–1891) : D. L. Evans

F
 Walter Fairbanks (1877–1884) : W. Fairbanks
 Archibald Fargus (1900–1901) : A. H. C. Fargus
 J. J. Ferris (1891–1895) : J. J. Ferris
 James Fewings (1872) : J. Fewings
 Charles Filgate (1870–1877) : C. R. Filgate
 Nick Finan (1975–1979) : N. H. Finan
 Ian Fisher (2002–2008) : I. D. Fisher
 Jim Foat (1972–1979) : J. C. Foat
 Ernest Ford (1874–1875) : E. C. B. Ford
 John Ford (1951) : J. K. Ford
 Percy Ford (1906–1908) : P. H. Ford
 Reggie Ford (1929–1936) : R. G. Ford
 Theodore Fowler (1901–1914) : T. H. Fowler
 John Fox (1872) : J. C. K. Fox
 Conway Francis (1895) : C. J. Francis
 Guy Francis (1884–1888) : G. Francis
 Howard Francis (1890–1894) : H. H. Francis
 James Franklin (2004–2010) : J. E. C. Franklin
 Sidney Freeman (1920–1921) : S. T. Freeman
 James Fuller (2011–2015) : J. K. Fuller

G
 Shannon Gabriel (2019) : S. T. Gabriel
 Henry Gallop (1877–1883) : H. G. Gallop
 Tommy Gange (1913–1920) : T. H. Gange
 Ben Gannon (1999–2002) : B. W. Gannon
 William Garne (1884) : W. H. Garne
 Mike Garnham (1978–1979) : M. A. Garnham
 Martin Gerrard (1991–1993) : M. J. Gerrard
 Alex Gidman (2001–2014) : A. P. R. Gidman
 Will Gidman (2011–2014) : W. R. S. Gidman
 Dave Gilbert (1991) : D. R. Gilbert
 Walter Gilbert (1876–1886) : W. R. Gilbert
 Godwin Giles (1903) : G. M. Giles
 Matthew Gitsham (2008) : M. T. Gitsham
 Tom Goddard (1922–1952) : T. W. J. Goddard
 Richard Godsell (1903–1910) : R. T. Godsell
 Harry Goodwin (1896–1907) : H. S. Goodwin
 Frederick Goodwyn (1871–1873) : F. W. Goodwyn
 Charles Gordon (1870–1875) : C. S. Gordon
 William Gouldsworthy (1921–1929) : W. R. Gouldsworthy
 Alfred Grace (1886–1897) : A. H. Grace
 E. M. Grace (1870–1896) : E. M. Grace
 Fred Grace (1870–1880) : G. F. Grace
 Henry Grace (1871) : H. Grace
 W. G. Grace (1870–1899) : W. G. Grace
 W. G. Grace junior (1892–1898) : W. G. Grace junior
 William St Clair Grant (1914) : W. S. Grant
 David Graveney (1972–1990) : D. A. Graveney
 Ken Graveney (1947–1964) : J. K. R. Graveney
 Tom Graveney (1948–1960) : T. W. Graveney
 David Green (1968–1973) : D. M. Green
 Michael Green (1912–1928) : M. A. Green
 Robert Green (1924) : R. L. H. Green
 Alan Greene (1876–1886) : A. D. Greene
 Robin Greene (1951) : R. M. Greene
 Vibert Greene (1987–1989) : V. S. Greene
 Carl Greenidge (2005–2008) : C. G. Greenidge
 Charles Greenway (1890–1891) : C. H. Greenway
 Thomas Gregg (1884–1889) : T. Gregg
 Herbert Gribble (1878–1882) : H. W. R. Gribble
 Patrick Grieshaber (2014) : P. J. Grieshaber
 Edward Griffiths (1885–1889) : E. L. Griffiths
 John Griffiths (1952–1957) : J. V. C. Griffiths
 Edward Gurney (1911) : E. R. Gurney

H
 Stamford Hacker (1899–1901) : W. S. Hacker
 Alfred Haines (1901–1910) : A. H. Haines
 Harold Hale (1886–1889) : H. Hale
 Ivor Hale (1947–1948) : I. E. Hale
 Walter Hale (1895–1909) : W. H. Hale
 John Halford (1870–1874) : J. Halford
 Miles Hammond (2013–2020) : M. A. H. Hammond
 Wally Hammond (1920–1951) : W. R. Hammond
 Thomas Hampton (2015–2016) : T. R. G. Hampton
 Tim Hancock (1991–2005) : T. H. C. Hancock
 Peter Handscomb (2015) : P. S. P. Handscomb
 George Hankins (2016–2020) : G. T. Hankins
 Harry Hankins (2019) : H. J. Hankins
 Leonard Harbin (1949–1951) : L. Harbin
 Mark Hardinges (1999–2008) : M. A. Hardinges
 Jon Hardy (1991) : J. J. E. Hardy
 Andrew Harris (2008) : A. J. Harris
 Chris Harris (2003) : C. Z. Harris
 Frank Harris (1929–1931) : F. A. Harris
 Stanley Harris (1902) : S. S. Harris
 Ian Harvey (1999–2006) : I. J. Harvey
 Percy Hattersley-Smith (1878–1880) : P. Hattersley-Smith
 John Hatton (1884) : J. Hatton
 Derek Hawkins (1952–1962) : D. G. Hawkins
 Edward Haygarth (1883) : E. B. Haygarth
 Carleton Haynes (1877–1879) : C. Haynes
 Richard Haynes (1930–1939) : R. W. Haynes
 Michael Heal (1973) : M. G. Heal
 John Healing (1894–1906) : J. A. Healing
 Percival Healing (1911) : P. Healing
 Hartley Heard (1969) : H. Heard
 Arthur Heath (1875) : A. H. Heath
 Walter Heath (1886) : W. Heath
 Lionel Hedges (1926–1929) : L. P. Hedges
 George Hemingway (1898) : G. E. Hemingway
 William Hemingway (1893–1900) : W. M. Hemingway
 Cameron Herring (2013–2014) : C. L. Herring
 Reginald Hewlett (1909–1922) : R. J. Hewlett
 Dominic Hewson (1996–2001) : D. R. Hewson
 Ryan Higgins (2018–2020) : R. F. Higgins
 Alastair Hignell (1974–1983) : A. J. Hignell
 Antony Hignell  (1947) : A. F. Hignell
 Alfred Hill (1904–1905) : A. W. Hill
 Frank Hinde (1895) : F. L. Hinde
 Simon Hinks (1992–1994) : S. G. Hinks
 Ernest Hoare (1929) : E. S. Hoare
 Norman Hobbs (1924) : N. F. C. Hobbs
 Henry Hodgkins (1900–1901) : H. J. J. Hodgkins
 Dean Hodgson (1989–1995) : G. D. Hodgson
 Grant Hodnett (2005–2009) : G. P. Hodnett
 Cyril Hollinshead (1941–1946) : C. Hollinshead
 George Holloway (1908–1911) : G. J. W. S. Holloway
 Reginald Holloway (1923–1926) : R. F. P. Holloway
 Vic Hopkins (1934–1948) : V. Hopkins
 Reginald Hopwood (1924) : R. A. Hopwood
 James Horlick (1907–1910) : J. N. Horlick
 R. Horton (1925) : R. Horton
 Worthington Hoskin (1912) : W. W. Hoskin
 Dan Housego (2012–2014) : D. M. Housego
 Benny Howell (2012–2020) : B. A. C. Howell
 John Howman (1922–1923) : J. Howman
 Henry Huggins (1901–1921) : H. J. Huggins
 Alan Hunt (1991–1992) : A. J. Hunt
 Kenneth Hunt (1926) : K. Hunt
 James Husey-Hunt (1880) : J. H. Husey-Hunt
 Gemaal Hussain (2009–2010) : G. M. Hussain
 Michael Hussey (2004) : M. E. K. Hussey

I
 Kassem Ibadulla (1987–1989) : K. B. K. Ibadulla
 John Iles (1890–1891) : J. H. Iles
 Alan Imlay (1905–1911) : A. D. Imlay
 Anthony Ireland (2007–2012) : A. J. Ireland

J
 Rattan Jaidka (1927) : R. C. Jaidka
 Burnet James (1914) : B. G. James
 Harold Jarman (1961–1971) : H. J. Jarman
 Kevin Jarvis (1988–1990) : K. B. S. Jarvis
 Harry Jefferies (1919) : H. Jefferies
 Herbert Jenner-Fust (1875) : H. Jenner-Fust
 Gilbert Jessop (1894–1914) : G. L. Jessop
 Hylton Jessop (1896–1897) : H. Jessop
 Osman Jessop (1901–1911) : O. W. T. Jessop
 Walter Jessop (1920–1921) : W. H. Jessop
 Geraint Jones (2014–2015) : G. O. Jones
 Hugh Jones (1914) : H. Jones

K
 Kadeer Ali (2005–2010) : Kadeer Ali
 R. P. Keigwin (1921–1923) : R. P. Keigwin
 Cuthbert Kempe (1877–1878) : C. R. Kempe
 Edmund King (1927) : E. P. King
 James King (1966) : J. M. R. King
 Henry Kingscote (1877) : H. B. Kingscote
 William Kington (1875–1876) : W. M. N. Kington
 Charles King-Turner (1922) : C. J. King-Turner
 Steven Kirby (2005–2010) : S. P. Kirby
 Sidney Kitcat (1892–1904) : S. A. P. Kitcat
 Michael Klinger (2013–2019) : M. Klinger
 Edward Knapp (1871–1880) : E. M. M. Knapp
 Roger Knight (1971–1975) : R. D. V. Knight
 Bill Knightley-Smith (1955–1957) : W. Knightley-Smith

L
 Tom Lace (2020) : T. C. Lace
 Graham Lake (1956–1958) : G. J. Lake
 Arthur Lamb (1895–1896) : A. Lamb
 George Lambert (1938–1957) : G. E. E. Lambert
 Robert Lanchbury (1971) : R. J. Lanchbury
 Sivell Lane (1901) : S. Lane
 Thomas Lang (1872–1874) : T. W. Lang
 Thomas Langdon (1900–1914) : T. Langdon
 David Lawrence (1981–1997) : D. V. Lawrence
 Joseph Lawson (1914) : J. F. Lawson
 Albert Leatham (1883–1884) : A. E. Leatham
 Solomon Levy (1910–1911) : S. Levy
 Jon Lewis (1995–2011) : J. Lewis
 Christopher Liddle (2017–2019) : C. J. Liddle
 Jake Lintott (2018) : J. B. Lintott
 Jeremy Lloyds (1985–1991) : J. W. Lloyds
 Arthur Luard (1892–1907) : A. J. H. Luard
 Frank Luce (1901–1911) : F. M. Luce
 Monte Lynch (1995–1997) : M. A. Lynch
 Bev Lyon (1921–1947) : B. H. Lyon

M
 James MacDonnell (1881) : J. E. MacDonnell
 Claude Mackay (1914) : C. L. Mackay
 Robert Mackenzie (1907) : R. T. H. Mackenzie
 John MacLean (1930–1932) : J. F. MacLean
 Greg Macmillan (1998) : G. I. Macmillan
 William Macpherson (1870–1871) : W. D. L. Macpherson
 Humphrey Mainprice (1905) : H. Mainprice
 Geoffrey Mains (1951–1954) : G. Mains
 Herbert Manners (1902–1911) : H. C. Manners
 Charles Margrett (1886) : C. H. Margrett
 Edmund Marsden (1909) : E. Marsden
 Hamish Marshall (2006–2016) : H. J. H. Marshall
 Alan Matthews (1933–1938) : A. I. Matthews
 John Matthews (1872) : J. L. Matthews
 Thomas Matthews (1870–1879) : T. G. Matthews
 Maurice McCanlis (1929) : M. A. McCanlis
 Graeme McCarter (2012–2014) : G. J. McCarter
 William McClintock (1920–1921) : W. K. McClintock
 Francis McHugh (1952–1956) : F. P. McHugh
 Craig McMillan (2003) : C. D. McMillan
 Bernard Meakin (1906) : B. Meakin
 Robert Melsome (1925–1934) : R. G. W. Melsome
 Michael Mence (1966–1967) : M. D. Mence
 Horace Merrick (1909–1911) : H. Merrick
 Sam Meston (1906) : S. P. Meston
 Barrie Meyer (1957–1971) : B. J. Meyer
 William Meyer (1909–1910) : W. E. Meyer
 Billy Midwinter (1877–1882) : W. E. Midwinter
 Edward Milburn (1990–1991) : E. T. Milburn
 Craig Miles (2011–2018) : C. N. Miles
 Robert Miles (1870–1879) : R. F. Miles
 Thomas Miller (1902–1914) : T. Miller
 Anthony Mills (1939–1948) : A. O. H. Mills
 David Mills (1958) : D. C. Mills
 John Mills (1870) : J. Mills
 Percy Mills (1902–1943) : P. T. Mills
 Arthur Milton (1948–1974) : C. A. Milton
 William Mirehouse (1872) : W. E. Mirehouse
 Ian Mitchell (1950–1952) : I. N. Mitchell
 William Moberly (1876–1887) : W. O. Moberly
 Imraan Mohammad (2000) : I. Mohammad
 Edgar Moline (1878) : E. R. Moline
 Francis Monkland (1874–1879) : F. G. Monkland
 Clifford Monks (1935–1952) : C. I. Monks
 Denis Moore (1930–1941) : D. N. Moore
 Donald Morgan (1907) : D. L. Morgan
 Edward Morris (1870) : E. S. Morris
 Ewart Morrison (1926–1933) : E. G. Morrison
 John Mortimore (1950–1975) : J. B. Mortimore
 Paul Muchall (2012) : P. B. Muchall
 Muttiah Muralitharan (2011–2012) : M. Muralitharan
 William Murch (1889–1903) : W. H. Murch
 Ernest Murdock (1889) : E. G. Murdock
 Philip Mustard (2016–2017) : P. Mustard

N
 William Nash (1905–1906) : W. W. H. Nash
 John Nason (1913–1914) : J. W. W. Nason
 Reginald Neal (1922) : R. G. Neal
 William Neale (1923–1948) : W. L. Neale
 Oliver Newby (2008) : O. J. Newby
 Arthur Newnham (1887–1894) : A. T. H. Newnham
 Ron Nicholls (1951–1975) : R. B. Nicholls
 George Nichols (1883–1885) : G. B. Nichols
 Rob Nicol (2012) : R. J. Nicol
 Kieran Noema-Barnett (2015–2018) : K. Noema-Barnett
 Ashley Noffke (2007) : A. A. Noffke
 James Norley (1877) : J. Norley
 Albert North (1912) : A. E. C. North
 Marcus North (2007–2008) : M. J. North
 Liam Norwell (2011–2018) : L. C. Norwell
 Arthur Nott (1903–1912) : A. S. Nott

O
 Kevin O'Brien (2011) : K. J. O'Brien
 Paul Owen (1990) : P. A. Owen

P
 Dallas Page (1933–1936) : D. A. C. Page
 Herbert Page (1883–1895) : H. V. Page
 Julian Page (1974) : J. T. Page
 John Painter (1881–1897) : J. R. Painter
 Arthur Paish (1898–1903) : A. J. Paish
 Charlie Parker (1903–1935) : C. W. L. Parker
 Grahame Parker (1932–1951) : G. W. Parker
 David Partridge (1976–1980) : M. D. Partridge
 David Payne (2009–2020) : D. A. Payne
 Ian Payne (1985–1986) : I. R. Payne
 Edward Peake (1881–1889) : E. Peake
 James Pearson (2002–2005) : J. A. Pearson
 Guy Pedder (1925) : G. R. Pedder
 Arthur Penduck (1908–1909) : A. E. Penduck
 George Pepall (1896–1904) : G. Pepall
 John Percival (1923) : J. D. Percival
 Tissara Perera (2017–2018) : N. L. T. C. Perera
 Wycliffe Phillips (1968–1970) : R. W. Phillips
 Arthur Pickering (1908) : A. Pickering
 Vyvian Pike (1994–1995) : V. J. Pike
 Alfred Pontifex (1871) : A. Pontifex
 Malcolm Pooley (1988–1990) : M. W. Pooley
 Andrew Pope (1911) : A. N. Pope
 Dudley Pope (1925–1927) : D. F. Pope
 Roland Pope (1891) : R. J. Pope
 Stephen Pope (2002–2003) : S. P. Pope
 William Porterfield (2008–2010) : W. T. S. Porterfield
 Charley Price (1919) : C. J. Price
 Frederic Price (1872) : F. R. Price
 Tom Price (2019–2020) : T. J. Price
 Hubert Prichard (1896) : H. C. Prichard
 Donald Priestley (1909–1910) : D. L. Priestley
 Mike Procter (1965–1981) : M. J. Procter
 Tom Pugh (1959–1962) : C. T. M. Pugh
 Geoff Pullar (1969–1970) : G. Pullar
 William Pullen (1882–1892) : W. W. F. Pullen

Q
 George Quentin (1874) : G. A. F. Quentin

R
 Octavius Radcliffe (1886–1893) : O. G. Radcliffe
 Douglas Raikes (1932) : D. C. G. Raikes
 Gilbert Rattenbury (1902–1909) : G. L. Rattenbury
 Chris Read (1997) : C. M. W. Read
 Aaron Redmond (2010) : A. J. Redmond
 Henry Reed (1921–1923) : H. A. Reed
 Jonty Rhodes (2003) : J. N. Rhodes
 Reginald Rice (1890–1903) : R. W. Rice
 Barry Richards (1965) : B. A. Richards
 Alfred Richardson (1897–1901) : A. G. Richardson
 Terence Riley (1964) : T. M. N. Riley
 George Robathan (1922) : G. L. Robathan
 Arthur Roberts (1908–1913) : A. W. Roberts
 Francis Roberts (1906–1914) : F. B. Roberts
 Frederick G. Roberts (1887–1905) : F. G. Roberts
 Lambert Roberts (1900) : L. L. Roberts
 Arthur Robinson (1878) : A. Robinson
 Douglas Robinson (1905–1926) : D. C. Robinson
 Foster Robinson (1903–1923) : F. G. Robinson
 John Robinson (1929) : J. F. Robinson
 Percy Robinson (1904–1921) : P. G. Robinson
 Vivian Robinson (1923) : V. J. Robinson
 Peter Rochford (1952–1957) : P. Rochford
 Gareth Roderick (2013–2020) : G. H. Roderick
 Paul Roebuck (1984) : P. G. P. Roebuck
 Francis Rogers (1924–1931) : F. G. Rogers
 Joseph Rogers (1929–1933) : J. A. Rogers
 Lawson Roll (1984) : L. M. Roll
 Paul Romaines (1982–1991) : P. W. Romaines
 George Romans (1899–1903) : G. Romans
 Arthur Roper (1920–1921) : A. W. F. Roper
 Adam Rouse (2014) : A. P. Rouse
 Frank Rowlands (1920–1922) : F. Rowlands
 William Rowlands (1901–1928) : W. H. Rowlands
 Will Rudge (2002–2008) : W. D. Rudge
 Jack Russell (1981–2004) : R. C. Russell
 Sid Russell (1965–1968) : S. E. J. Russell
 Thomas Rust (1914) : T. H. Rust

S
 Sadiq Mohammad (1972–1982) : Sadiq Mohammad
 Edward Sainsbury (1891–1892) : E. Sainsbury
 Gary Sainsbury (1983–1987) : G. E. Sainsbury
 Malcolm Salter (1907–1925) : M. G. Salter
 Ramnaresh Sarwan (2005) : R. R. Sarwan
 Henry Savory (1937) : H. J. Savory
 Ian Saxelby (2008–2014) : I. D. Saxelby
 Chadd Sayers (2019) : C. J. Sayers
 Colin Scott (1938–1954) : C. J. Scott
 Edward Scott (1937) : E. K. Scott
 George Scott (2020) : G. F. B. Scott
 Osmund Scott (1905) : O. Scott
 Richard Scott (1991–1993) : R. J. Scott
 Frederick Seabrook (1919–1935) : F. J. Seabrook
 Walter Seabrook (1928) : W. G. Seabrook
 Arthur Sellick (1903–1904) : A. S. Sellick
 Arthur Serjeant (1883) : A. T. Serjeant
 Cyril Sewell (1895–1919) : C. O. H. Sewell
 Jack Sewell (1937–1942) : F. J. Sewell
 Shabbir Ahmed (2004) : Shabbir Ahmed
 Julian Shackleton (1971–1978) : J. H. Shackleton
 Brian Shantry (1978–1979) : B. K. Shantry
 Josh Shaw (2016–2020) : J. Shaw
 Kamran Sheeraz (1994–1997) : K. P. Sheeraz
 David Shepherd (1965–1979) : D. R. Shepherd
 John Shepherd (1982–1987) : J. N. Shepherd
 Edward Sheppard (1921–1922) : E. C. J. Sheppard
 Shoaib Malik (2003–2004) : Shoaib Malik
 Tom Shrewsbury (2013–2014) : T. W. Shrewsbury
 Herbert Shrimpton (1923) : H. J. D. Shrimpton
 Roger Sillence (2001–2005) : R. J. Sillence
 William Simmonds (1924–1925) : W. H. Simmonds
 David Simpkins (1982) : D. P. Simpkins
 Reg Sinfield (1924–1939) : R. A. Sinfield
 David Smith (1956–1971) : D. R. Smith
 Edwin Smith (1875–1877) : E. G. Smith
 Harry Smith (1912–1935) : H. Smith
 Mike Smith (1991–2004) : A. M. Smith
 Oliver Smith (1987) : O. C. K. Smith
 Tom Smith (2013–2020) : T. M. J. Smith
 Jeremy Snape (1999–2002) : J. N. Snape
 Steve Snell (2005–2010) : S. D. Snell
 Kenneth Soutar (1908) : K. H. Soutar
 Craig Spearman (2002–2009) : C. M. Spearman
 Edward Spry (1899–1921) : E. J. Spry
 Javagal Srinath (1995) : J. Srinath
 Ernest Staddon (1912) : E. H. Staddon
 John Stanton (1921–1922) : J. L. Stanton
 Tom Stayt (2007–2009) : T. P. Stayt
 Eric Stephens (1927–1941) : E. J. Stephens
 Franklyn Stephenson (1982–1983) : F. D. Stephenson
 Joseph Stephenson-Jellie (1896–1908) : J. W. A. Stephenson-Jellie
 Wes Stewart (1966) : R. W. Stewart
 Andy Stovold (1973–1990) : A. W. Stovold
 Martin Stovold (1978–1982) : M. W. Stovold
 George Strachan (1870–1882) : G. Strachan
 Edward Studd (1919) : E. B. T. Studd
 John Sullivan (1967–1977) : J. P. Sullivan
 Godfrey Surman (1936–1937) : G. P. Surman
 David Surridge (1980–1982) : D. Surridge
 Roy Swetman (1972–1974) : R. Swetman
 Andrew Symonds (1995–1996) : A. Symonds

T
 Noel Tagart (1900–1901) : N. O. Tagart
 Alan Tait (1978) : A. Tait
 William Tavaré (2014–2018) : W. A. Tavaré
 Bert Tayler (1914) : H. W. Tayler
 Frederick Tayler (1911) : F. E. Tayler
 Chris Taylor (1999–2011) : C. G. Taylor
 Clifford Taylor (1899–1900) : C. J. Taylor
 Edmund Taylor (1876–1886) : E. J. Taylor
 Frank Taylor (1873) : F. Taylor
 Jack Taylor (2010–2020) : J. M. R. Taylor
 Matt Taylor (2011–2020) : M. D. Taylor
 Phil Taylor (1938) : P. H. Taylor
 Geoffrey Tedstone (1989–1990) : G. A. Tedstone
 David Thomas (1988) : D. J. Thomas
 Edgar Thomas (1895–1907) : E. L. Thomas
 Frank Thomas (1901–1906) : F. E. Thomas
 Jackson Thompson (2007–2008) : J. G. Thompson
 Philip Thorn (1974) : P. L. Thorn
 Herbert Timms (1911–1912) : H. H. Timms
 Keith Tomlins (1986–1987) : K. P. Tomlins
 William Tonge (1880) : W. C. Tonge
 Thomas Toogood (1900–1914) : T. H. Toogood
 Wilson Tovey (1901) : W. G. Tovey
 Charlie Townsend (1893–1922) : C. L. Townsend
 Frank Townsend (1870–1892) : F. Townsend
 Frank Townsend, junior (1896–1900) : F. N. Townsend
 Miles Townsend (1903–1906) : A. F. M. Townsend
 Sean Tracy (1983) : S. R. Tracy
 Nicholas Trainor (1996–1998) : N. J. Trainor
 Christopher Trembath (1982–1984) : C. R. Trembath
 James Tremenheere (1872) : J. H. A. Tremenheere
 Frank Troup (1914–1921) : F. C. Troup
 Walter Troup (1887–1911) : W. Troup
 Thomas Truman (1910–1913) : T. A. Truman
 Bertrand Turnbull (1911) : B. Turnbull
 Charles Turnbull (1873–1879) : C. L. Turnbull
 Charles Turner (1886–1889) : C. Turner
 Ronald Turner (1906) : R. Turner
 Henry Twizell (1985–1986) : P. H. Twizell
 Andrew Tye (2016–2019) : A. J. Tye
 Cyril Tyler (1936–1938) : C. Tyler

V
 Graeme van Buuren (2016–2020) : G. L. van Buuren
 Paul van der Gucht (1932–1933) : P. I. van der Gucht
 Justin Vaughan (1992) : J. T. C. Vaughan
 Martin Vernon (1977) : M. J. Vernon
 Walter Vizard (1882–1890) : W. O. Vizard

W
 Nesbit Wallace (1871) : N. W. Wallace
 Courtney Walsh (1984–1998) : C. A. Walsh
 Albert Waters (1923–1925) : A. E. Waters
 Bertram Watkins (1932–1938) : B. T. L. Watkins
 Frederic Watts (1905) : F. A. Watts
 Lawrence Watts (1958) : L. D. Watts
 Frederick Weaver (1897–1909) : F. C. Weaver
 George Wedel (1925–1929) : G. Wedel
 Frederick Weeks (1925–1928) : F. J. Weeks
 Bomber Wells (1951–1959) : B. D. Wells
 Stuart Westley (1969–1971) : S. A. Westley
 Phil Weston (2003–2006) : W. P. C. Weston
 Richard Whiley (1954) : R. K. Whiley
 Alison White (1912–1919) : A. K. G. White
 Ray White (1962–1964) : R. C. White
 Mike Whitney (1981) : M. R. Whitney
 Frank Wicks (1912) : F. C. Wicks
 Marcus Wight (1993–1994) : R. M. Wight
 David Wigley (2008) : D. H. Wigley
 Eric Wignall (1952–1953) : E. W. E. Wignall
 Alfred Wilcox (1939–1949) : A. G. S. Wilcox
 Alan Wilkins (1980–1981) : A. H. Wilkins
 John Wilkinson (1899–1920) : J. Wilkinson
 John Williams (1908) : J. N. Williams
 Leo Williams (1922) : L. Williams
 Philip Williams (1919–1925) : P. F. C. Williams
 Reggie Williams (1990–2001) : R. C. J. Williams
 Ricardo Williams (1991–1995) : R. C. Williams
 Stephen Williams (1978) : S. Williams
 Kane Williamson (2011–2012) : K. S. Williamson
 Gregory Willows (2019) : G. P. Willows
 Andy Wilson (1936–1955) : A. E. Wilson
 Graham Wiltshire (1953–1960) : G. G. M. Wiltshire
 Stephen Windaybank (1979–1982) : S. J. Windaybank
 Matthew Windows (1992–2006) : M. G. N. Windows
 Tony Windows (1960–1974) : A. R. Windows
 Alec Winstone (1906–1909) : A. E. Winstone
 Arthur Winterbotham (1885) : A. S. Winterbotham
 James Winterbotham (1902) : J. P. Winterbotham
 Henry Witchell (1923) : H. G. Witchell
 Russell Wood (1950–1951) : R. B. Wood
 Reginald Woodman (1925) : R. G. Woodman
 Robert Woodman (2008–2010) : R. J. Woodman
 William Woof (1878–1902) : W. A. Woof
 Gilbert Wooley (1920) : G. G. Wooley
 Claud Woolley (1909) : C. N. Woolley
 Simon Wootton (1984) : S. H. Wootton
 Daniel Worrall (2018–2019) : D. J. Worrall
 Harry Wrathall (1894–1907) : H. Wrathall
 Charles Wreford-Brown (1886–1898) : C. Wreford-Brown
 Oswald Wreford-Brown (1900) : O. E. Wreford-Brown
 Edward Wright, born 1858 (1878) : E. F. Wright
 Edward Wright, born 1874 (1894–1898) : E. C. Wright
 Tony Wright (1980–1998) : A. J. Wright
 George Wyatt (1871–1876) : G. N. Wyatt

Y
 William Yalland (1910) : W. S. Yalland
 Gerald Yorke (1925) : G. J. Yorke
 Vincent Yorke (1898) : V. W. Yorke
 Ed Young (2010–2013) : E. G. C. Young
 Martin Young (1949–1964) : D. M. Young
 Shaun Young (1997) : S. Young

Z
 Zaheer Abbas (1972–1985) : Zaheer Abbas

See also
 List of Gloucestershire cricket captains

References

Bibliography
 

Players

Gloucestershire
Cricketers